Michail Liapis (alternate spelling: Michalis) (born March 11, 1995) is a Greek professional basketball player for Iraklis of the Greek A2 Basket League. He is a 1.92 m (6'3¾") tall shooting guard.

Professional career
After playing with the youth clubs of PAOK, Liapis began his pro career in 2011, with the senior men's team of PAOK, in the Greek League. After 5 years, he decided to leave the club and he joined Kolossos Rodou of the Greek League.

On July 5, 2017, Liapis joined Politehnica Iași.

In August 2018, Liapis signed with Grindavík of the Icelandic Úrvalsdeild karla. He was released in October 2018 after appearing in two games where he averaged 6.5 points, 4.5 rebounds and 2.0 assists.

He spent the 2019-20 season in Spain with Culleredo. Liapis returned to Kolossos Rodou on September 23, 2020. In 16 games, he averaged 1.2 points, playing around 5 minutes per contest. On August 6, 2021, Liapis signed with 2nd division club Charilaos Trikoupis.

Greek national team
Liapis has been a member of the Greek junior national teams. With the junior national teams of Greece, he played at the 2011 FIBA Europe Under-16 Championship, the 2013 FIBA Europe Under-18 Championship, the 2014 FIBA Europe Under-20 Championship, and the 2015 FIBA Europe Under-20 Championship.

References

External links
Eurocup Profile
FIBA Profile
FIBA Europe Profile
Eurobasket.com Profile
Greek Basket League Profile 
Draftexpress.com Profile
Úrvalsdeild statistics 

1995 births
Living people
Charilaos Trikoupis B.C. players
Greek men's basketball players
Grindavík men's basketball players
Iraklis Thessaloniki B.C. players
Kolossos Rodou B.C. players
P.A.O.K. BC players
Shooting guards
Úrvalsdeild karla (basketball) players
Basketball players from Thessaloniki